Earned media (or free media) refers to publicity gained through promotional efforts other than advertising (paid media) or branding (owned media).

Background
There are many types of media available to online marketers and fit into the broad categories: owned, paid, and earned media.

Owned media is defined as communication channels that are within one's control, such as websites, blogs, or email. Paid media refers mostly to traditional advertising.

Earned media cannot be bought or owned; it can only be gained organically, when content receives recognition and a following through communication channels such as social media and word of mouth. Earned media often refers specifically to publicity gained through editorial influence of various kinds. The media may include any mass media outlets, such as newspaper, television, radio, and the Internet, and may include a variety of formats, such as news articles or shows, letters to the editor, editorials, and polls on television and the Internet.

Examples 
Many consider earned media to be the most cost-effective method of marketing.  As a result, many companies are investing in earned media.  The increased use of earned media is converging traditional owned and paid methods of marketing.

The increasing use of earned media has provided marketers with new ways in which to interact and engage their customers.  These innovative approaches are replacing traditional marketing methods such as email and banner ads, and provide innovative methods to find, optimize, and measure return on earned media investments.

Examples:
 On March 6, 2012, Dollar Shave Club launched their online video campaign. In the first 48 hours of their video debuting on YouTube they had over 12,000 people signing up for the service. The video cost just $4500 to make and as of November 2015 has had more than 21 million views. The video was considered one of the best viral marketing campaigns of 2012 and won "Best Out-of-Nowhere Video Campaign" at the 2012 AdAge Viral Video Awards.
 The Big Word Project, launched in 2008, aimed to redefine the Oxford English Dictionary by allowing people to submit their website as the definition of their chosen word.  The project, created to fund two Masters students' educations, attracted the attention of bloggers worldwide, and was featured on Daring Fireball and Wired Magazine.
 In mid-2016, an Indian tea company (TE-A-ME) has delivered 6,000 tea bags to Donald Trump and launched a video content on YouTube. and Facebook. The video campaign received various awards including most creative PR stunt in Southeast Asia after receiving earned media values like 52000+ organic video shares, 152000+ engagements in online communities, 3.1M video view in first 72-hour and hundreds of traditional publication mentions (including Mashable, The IndependentQuartz,  Indian Express, Buzzfeed, Adage, Campaign) across 80+ countries.

Impact
A Nielsen study in 2013 found that earned media (also described in the report as word-of-mouth) is the most trusted source of information in all countries it surveyed worldwide, and is the channel most likely to stimulate the consumer to action. Other authorities make the distinction between online and offline earned media/word-of-mouth, and have shown that offline word-of-mouth has been found to be more effective than online word-of-mouth.

Both traditional earned media (publicity and press events) and social earned media (social network and blogs) have been found to
increase sales, with social earned media having the greatest impact.

References

External links
 Earned Media proponent Fred Wilson gives relevant examples of earned media success stories

Public opinion
Public relations
Social influence
Marketing techniques